Banuri (Palampur) is Ward No. 14 of MC Palampur which is situated in Dhauladhar Valley in Himachal Pradesh (India). It has around 4 km area and population around 3000. Banuri has many tea gardens.  It has a small river (khad) named Oa at its one end.  It is situated 4 km away from Palampur ISBT. Also near by is artists' colony Andretta, Himachal Pradesh.

Education 
The literacy rate in Banuri is very high. It has four Senior Secondary schools:-
 Saheed Major Sudhir Walia Senior Secondary School.
 Jai Public School.
 Crescent Public School.
 Modern Public School.
 Sri Sai University, Palampur is situated 2 km away from here.
 Dr GC Negi College of Veterinary and Animal Sciences is situated 1 km away from here.
 CSIR-Institute of Himalayan Bioresource Technology is situated 1.5 km away from here.
 Aisect Computer Education Lower Banuri.

Other Attractions
 Palampur Science centre

References 

Villages in Kangra district